The 1900 UCI Track Cycling World Championships were the World Championship for track cycling. They took place in Paris, France from 12 to 18 August 1900. Four events for men were contested, two for professionals and two for amateurs. Apart from the four events a tandem event was organized. This race has never been officially recognized. The Dutch duo Harrie Meyers-Fernando Tomaselli won ahead of the French duo Edmond Jacquelin-Lucien Louvet and the French-American duo Charles Vanoni-Robert Protin. Because the race was not official the medalists are not listed in the list of Tandem World Champions.

Medal summary

Medal table

References

Track cycling
UCI Track Cycling World Championships by year
International cycle races hosted by France
Uci
UCI Track Cycling World Championships
UCI Track Cycling World Championships
UCI Track Cycling World Championships